Lee Baldwin (born April 26, 1988) is a Canadian former professional ice hockey player. He most notably played for the Connecticut Whale in the American Hockey League (AHL).

Playing career
Undrafted, on March 22, 2010, Baldwin was signed as a free agent by the New York Rangers to a two-year entry-level contract. He was assigned to the Rangers affiliates, the Connecticut Whale of the American Hockey League and the Greenville Road Warriors of the ECHL for the duration of his contract.

On August 9, 2012, Baldwin was signed to a one-year ECHL contract to remain with the Greenville Road Warriors.

In the 2013–14 season, on December 13, 2013, Baldwin was traded by the Road Warriors to the Stockton Thunder in exchange for Brayden Irwin.

On May 27, 2014, Baldwin signed his first contract abroad, agreeing to a one-year contract with Danish club, Odense Bulldogs of the Metal Ligaen. In the 2014–15 season, Baldwin contributed with the Bulldogs to produce 22 points in 36 games, and featured in their brief post-season before suffering a first round elimination.

On June 23, 2015, Baldwin left Denmark for Germany, signing a one-year contract with second tier club, ESV Kaufbeuren of the DEL2.

Baldwin moved to the UK's EIHL to sign for Braehead Clan ahead of the 2016–17 season. In June 2017, Baldwin followed Braehead teammate, Corey Cowick, in signing for Ligue Magnus side Gamyo d'Épinal. He completed his eight-year professional career following the 2017–18 season.

Career statistics

Awards and honours

References

External links

1988 births
Living people
Alaska Anchorage Seawolves men's ice hockey players
Braehead Clan players
Canadian ice hockey defencemen
Connecticut Whale (AHL) players
Greenville Road Warriors players
Hartford Wolf Pack players
Ice hockey people from British Columbia
ESV Kaufbeuren players
Odense Bulldogs players
Sportspeople from Victoria, British Columbia
Stockton Thunder players
Canadian expatriate ice hockey players in France
Canadian expatriate ice hockey players in Scotland
Canadian expatriate ice hockey players in Denmark
Canadian expatriate ice hockey players in the United States
Canadian expatriate ice hockey players in Germany